Lonzo is both a surname and a given name. Notable people with the name include:

Surname
Fred Lonzo (born 1950), American jazz trombonist

Given name
Lonzo or Lloyd George (1924–1991), part of American country music duo of Lonzo and Oscar
Lonzo Ball (born 1997), American basketball player
Lonzo Bullie (born 1947), American football coach
Lonzo Nzekwe, filmmaker

See also
Alonzo